Bakhtiyar Kozhatayev ( Baqtiyar Qojatayev; born March 28, 1992 in Petropavl) is a Kazakh former cyclist, who rode professionally for UCI WorldTeam  between 2015 and 2018.

He was named in the start list for the 2016 Giro d'Italia, and the 2017 Tour de France.

Major results

2012
 3rd Overall Tour d'Azerbaïdjan
1st Mountains classification
2013
 1st Mountains classification Le Triptyque des Monts et Châteaux
 3rd Overall Tour d'Azerbaïdjan
 4th Overall Tour de l'Avenir
 4th Tour of Almaty
 5th Overall Coupe des nations Ville Saguenay
 6th Overall Tour Alsace
 7th Gran Premio di Poggiana
 9th GP Capodarco
2014
 2nd Tour Bohemia
 5th Road race, Asian Under-23 Road Championships
 6th La Côte Picarde
 9th Overall Giro della Valle d'Aosta
2015
 1st Stage 2 (TTT) Vuelta a Burgos
 7th Overall Tour of Hainan
2016
 1st Stage 1 (TTT) Giro del Trentino
2017
 1st Team time trial, Asian Road Championships
 5th Overall Tour of Almaty

Grand Tour general classification results timeline

References

External links

1992 births
Living people
Kazakhstani male cyclists
Cyclists at the 2016 Summer Olympics
Olympic cyclists of Kazakhstan
People from Petropavl